Megacorpstate is a form of market structure that designs new strategies to systematize the cartel power in the world. This particular market framework consists of oligopolistic interdependent nations-states and multinational corporations, which have established alliance to own majority of the market power. The most prominent organizations within the structure are OPEC and the Seven Sisters that include Exxon, Mobil, Socal, Royal Dutch-Shell, BP, Texaco and Gulf. Regardless of its great influence, Megacorpstate does not have a major recognition in the world. The main reason for its unfamiliarity is its disinclination to characterize itself as a separate market structure.

Coinage of the term "Megacorpstate" 

Alfred Eichner, creative theorist, Keynesian economist and Rutgers University economics professor introduced the term the "megacorp" in his book "The Megacorp and Oligopoly" (1976). The term was initially used to describe the powerful and expansive corporate groups that held monopolistic power over multiple markets. Like many intellectuals who studied Eichner's work, J.Barkley Rosser. Jr, endeavoured to expand the ideas and research on megacorporations. He recognized a strong alliance present between the monopolistically powerful multinational oil corporation groups and nation states. As a result of such interlocking relationships and trade, these participants formed a rather rare market structure. After careful analysis and consideration, Rosser decided on labeling the new formed market, "Megacorpstate".

Firms transforming into Megacorpstate 
Stephen Hymer, influential Canadian economist, also researched on the activities relating to multinational corporate firms and their growth. Through his research, he deduced the growth factors and processes by which small firms evolved into giant multinational organizations.  By taking small United States firms into consideration, Hymer explained the stages a company passed in order to reach hierarchy in the market. Stephen Hymer observed the historical pattern of those U.S firms which, developed from small workshops to factories to national organizations. Soon after they transformed into national organizations, they strived to become multidivisional and later multinational corporations. Upon achieving dominance in the market as multinational megacorporations, they formed alliance and partnerships with similar or superior status giant corporations to enter the new formed market of Megacorporstate.

Structure of Megacorpstate 
Megacorpstate was one of the first market structure to have multinational operations. As a result of having such diversity, the market is reputed to have the most expansive degree of vertical integration in the world. Megacorpstate has integrated extensive network of joint pipeline agreements, joint operations and interconnecting relationships in its structure. These elements under the market provide platforms of joint cooperation and confidence between member groups of organizations. Majority of the companies that control the Megacorpstate market are petroleum companies and nations.

The Seven Sisters 
The Seven Sisters hold a major position in this market structure. Formed in the 1950s, the group was an alliance of seven multinational oil companies in the world. The member organizations Exxon, Mobil, Socal, Royal Dutch-Shell, BP, Texaco and Gulf held dominance over 85% of the petroleum reserves until the 1970s. However, with the emergence of OPEC, its influence over the petroleum sector diminished.  The Seven Sisters have formed alliance with other multinational oil companies and nations to share the market of Megacorpstate.

OPEC 
OPEC is the most dominant and influential entity in the Megacorpstate. Every economic fluctuation that is experienced by this organization affects the entire market structure. As a result, a crucial relationship between the two entities is to be observed. In order to fully understand the mechanism and functionality of Megacorpstate, OPEC has to be understood first.

OPEC features 
OPEC is a mnemonic for Organization of the Petroleum Exporting Countries. It was established in September 1960 in Baghdad by five founder nations, Iran, Iraq, Venezuela, Saudi Arabia and Kuwait. The initiative was taken to promote economic enrichment and stability among its member nations and to decrease the oil market volatility. As of May 2017, the organization consists of 14 countries which earn the majority of their income through oil revenues: Algeria, Angola, Ecuador, Equatorial Guinea, Gabon, Iran, Iraq, Kuwait, Libya, Nigeria, Qatar, Saudi Arabia (the dominant exporter), United Arab Emirates, Venezuela. According to OPEC, membership is open to any nation that has substantial oil resource and observes the same principles as the organization, subject to approval by the member governments.

Quota structure 
OPEC holds meetings with its members at least twice per year. During these meetings, the members usually examine market conditions and fix quotas for themselves. The members divide the shares of oil production among the nation states. Based on the quota system, the percentages of oil production are divided according to the stated reserves of each country. Consequently, in order to obtain larger percentage share, member nations often overstate their reserves. Following this system, OPEC endeavours to change the market. This is an indication that the OPEC petroleum traders exercise enough market power to influence oil prices around the world. They might increase oil prices much higher than the true economic price of the resources and reshape the Megacorpstate.

Decision making structure 
There are no formal literature that explains the process of decision making of OPEC. However, economists have carried out extensive research to produce a layout of the decision making processes. Models that have been designed can be grouped according to (1) OPEC members having power over decision making. (2) The economic ambition of the OPEC members. (3) The strategy applied to accomplish the ambitions. There are many analytical views on the decision making structure. One view discusses that OPEC acts as a single entity and makes the final decision on prices after the members have negotiated among themselves. Another view suggests that a decision is reached after negotiations have been made among small and large shareholders after considering supply restrictions and rationing. Regardless of such perspectives, there is no formal model to represent the system.

Oil pricing 
Like the decision making structure, there is no fixed model for price reflection. It greatly depends on the member nations to finalize a rate. Nevertheless, considering OPEC's market power, economists believe it should have set higher prices to generate higher profits. Since the organization sets considerably low prices, many theorists have presented explanations for this act. Some have proposed that the intention behind lower prices is to reserve the oil for future investments or as an alternative to generating current revenues. Other economists believe that its motivation to establish low prices is due to a force that is present within its own organization and call the force Saudi Arabia.

Influence of Saudi Arabia 
Oil state Saudi Arabia has always been adamant in maintaining low prices. Saudi Arabia is by far the biggest producer in OPEC and supplies approximately 30% of total OPEC output. Consequently, it is the most influential member of the organization.

OPEC stability and performance 

OPEC claims to generate profits for oil firms by adjusting the petroleum supply and supporting prices. However, the strategy does not help it to substantially dominate the Megacorpstate in order to obtain gradual rise of income and revenues. If the organization decides to adjust supply to increase revenues, the nation states will benefit from temporary gain and simultaneously give rise to macroeconomic variation. Nevertheless, the greater effect of this action will be deceleration of the world economy. If OPEC's oil economy becomes unstable, then the oil production of the member nations may become unstable as well. Hence some nations might choose to quit the organization in order to stabilize their oil sectors. Since OPEC is the dominant entity in the Megacorpstate, fluctuations in its performance will affect the market accordingly. For example, with the increase of its revenue stability, the stability of the market will increase and vice versa.

Assumptions on OPEC's stability 
Many economists predicted that the organization would soon die after it became a powerful price setter in the year 1973. In support of their views, they argued that the organization would become more unstable with expansion and each member would be determined to increase output and discount prices according to its preference. When all the member traders begin to act according to their own agendas, the price setting system will collapse. Surprisingly, the petroleum empire did not get disassembled; rather it expanded further.

Future of Megacorpstate 

The Megacorpstate has been successful in manipulating the oil prices around the world due to the relationship between the OPEC and the multinational giant corporations. Nevertheless, due to existing laws of member countries and market structures, it does not disclose itself as a separate and unique market. OPEC is already deeply involved with Megacorpstate. It is predicted that the organization along with other multinational organizations will unify and define the structures within the market with time. A parallel and opposing prediction exists that speaks about the disintegration of Megacorpstate due to the breakdown of OPEC. One way to diminish the chance of this prediction is to have a flexible oil production scheme of Saudi Arabia. If the country's petroleum production is adjustable, it can save OPEC from failing. Megacorpstate is undoubtedly a usual market structure. Nevertheless, it can include other sectors of energy in future besides oil and petroleum. A possible sector would be uranium industry. However, the possibility of formation of another Megacorpstate is highly unlikely as the market involves many complications and risks.

References 

Imperfect competition
Market structure